is a Japanese pink film actress who is best known for her appearances in Nikkatsu's Roman Porno films with an S&M theme during the 1970s. In the following listing, films are sourced with links to their listings at IMDb (a), The Complete Index to World Film(b), and/or The Japanese Movie Database (c).

1967

1968

1969

1971

1972

1973

1974

1975

1976

1977

1978

1979

1984

2000

Sources

  
 
 

Actress filmographies
Japanese filmographies